TRIC may refer to:

 TRiC (complex), a multiprotein complex of eukaryotic cells involved in protein folding
 Tahoe Reno Industrial Center, an industrial and manufacturing park in Storey County, Nevada
 Television and Radio Industries Club, a UK industry association
 Tric, a fictional nightclub from the television series One Tree Hill